Raja Zarith Sofiah binti Almarhum Sultan Idris Iskandar Al-Mutawakkil Alallahi Shah Afifullah (born 14 August 1959) is the Permaisuri (Queen consort) of Johor. She was born as a member of the Perak Royal Family. While still attending Somerville College, Oxford, she married the heir to the throne of Johor. Now a mother of six, she participates in the work of non-governmental organisations and universities, and writes a periodical column for a newspaper.

Early life and education
Raja Zarith Sofiah was born in Istana Raja Muda, Teluk Anson, on 14 August 1959 as the third child and second daughter of Sultan Idris Shah II of Perak and Raja Perempuan Muzwin binti Raja Arif Shah. Her parents were first step-cousins once removed. She is a second step-cousin of Sultan Azlan Shah of Perak. Sultan Azlan's paternal grandfather, her paternal grandfather and her mother's paternal grandfather were children of Sultan Idris Shah I of Perak, all with different mothers.

She attended Datin Khadijah Primary School and then Raja Perempuan Kelsom School in Kuala Kangsar, before moving on to Cheltenham Ladies' College to complete her secondary education. She attended Somerville College, Oxford and obtained her Bachelor of Arts in Chinese studies from the University of Oxford in 1983 and her Master of Arts in 1986.

Current activities
Raja Zarith Sofiah is the chancellor of Universiti Teknologi Malaysia. She is also a Fellow of the School of Language Studies and Linguistics, Universiti Kebangsaan Malaysia (UKM). She delivered the keynote address at the 2011 UKM International Language Conference.
She is the Royal Patron of Oxford University Malaysia Club (beginning Michaelmas 2011).

Raja Zarith is a strong advocate of improving the use of English in Malaysia. In addition to Malay and English, she speaks Mandarin Chinese, Italian and French.

She has authored several children's books, including Puteri Gunung Ledang, and writes for The Star's "Mind Matters" column.

Raja Zarith supports various charitable and non-governmental organisations. She is a patron of the Johor Spastic Children's Association, Rotary Club of Tebrau Heart Fund and the Malaysian English Language Teaching Association. She is also the Chair of the Community Services Committee of the Malaysian Red Crescent Society.

Raja Zarith Sofiah is also active in religious activities. There is a foundation which is named after her which is called Yayasan Raja Zarith Sofiah Negeri Johor. It was launched on 28 November 2012 at the Kuala Lumpur campus of Universiti Teknologi Malaysia The foundation's purpose is to generate funds for various educational programmes. The foundation was set up after the Sultan of Johor and she agreed with the proposal by Universiti Teknologi Malaysia, in line with the Royal Johor Institution, in developing the teachings of Islam.

Marriage and children
On 22 September 1982, Raja Zarith Sofiah married the (then) Tunku Mahkota (Crown Prince) of Johor, Tunku Ibrahim Ismail. Ibrahim Ismail was proclaimed the 25th Sultan of Johor after the death of his father in January 2010.  Raja Zarith was addressed as DYMM, the consort of the Sultan of Johor until her coronation took place. On her coronation day, she was conferred the title Permaisuri of Johor (Queen Consort of Johor).

She and Sultan Ibrahim have six children:
Tunku Ismail Idris Abdul Majid Abu Bakar (born 30 June 1984), the Tunku Mahkota of Johor
Tunku Tun Aminah, (born 8 April 1986), a cosmetics designer
Tunku Idris, the Tunku Temenggong of Johor (born 25 December 1987)
Tunku Abdul Jalil, the Tunku Laksamana of Johor (5 July 1990 – 5 December 2015)
Tunku Abdul Rahman, the Tunku Panglima of Johor (born 5 February 1993)
Tunku Abu Bakar, the Tunku Putera of Johor (born 30 May 2001)

Honours

Honours of Johor 
  (Zarith Sofiah, Queen of Johor) :
  First Class of the Royal Family Order of Johor (DK I)
  Second Class of the Royal Family Order of Johor (DK II)
  First Class of the Order of the Crown of Johor (SPMJ)
  Grand Knight of the Order of Sultan Ibrahim of Johor (SMIJ) – (2017)
  Sultan Ibrahim Coronation Medal (PSI, 1st class, 23 March 2015)

Honours of Perak 
  (Zarith Sofiah, née Princess of Perak) :
  Recipient of the Royal Family Order of Perak (DK, 22 May 2012)
  Grand Knight of the Order of Cura Si Manja Kini (the Perak Sword of State, SPCM, March 1983) with title Dato' Seri

Ancestry

References

External links

 "Mind Matters" at The Star

Johor royal consorts
House of Temenggong of Johor
Royal House of Perak
Living people
1960 births
People from Perak
Malaysian people of Malay descent
Malaysian Muslims
People educated at Cheltenham Ladies' College
People associated with the National University of Malaysia
Alumni of Somerville College, Oxford
Daughters of monarchs

First Classes of the Royal Family Order of Johor
Knights Grand Commander of the Order of the Crown of Johor